Living is a group of regional Canadian lifestyle television programs that aired on CBC Television stations. The initial broadcast was on January 15, 2007. Due to budgetary issues, the Living programs were not continued past the end of the 2008–09 television season. The final episodes of each Living series aired on August 28, 2009.

Most of the CBC stations which aired Living produced their own locally oriented programs. Most used the title format Living (Location), although the shows in Toronto and Ottawa were titled Living in (Location) due to similarly named programs on Rogers TV in those markets.

Overview
Similar to the 1970s U.S. syndicated series PM Magazine, each local Living program consists of a mixture of locally produced segments and others produced for national broadcast.

In most markets, the series aired at 3:00 p.m. local time weekdays. Repeats of the Newfoundland and Labrador edition, which initially aired at 3:30 NT, later aired Tuesday to Friday at 7:00 p.m. NT on CBNT, to fill a half-hour gap in the national schedule caused by the local newscast airing at 6:00 p.m. NT.

Segments from the Living programs were later repurposed for a national series titled Breeze, hosted by Maureen Welch in Ottawa. That program aired during the 2010–11 season as part of the Saturday daytime schedule on CBC.

List of Living programs

 Living Calgary (CBRT; also aired on CBXT) - hosted by Alex Ruiz
 Living Halifax, formerly Living East (CBHT; also aired on CBCT/CBAT) - hosted by Heidi Petracek
 Living in Ottawa (CBOT) - hosted by Maureen Welch
 Living in Toronto (CBLT; also aired on CBET) - hosted by Mary Ito
 Living Montreal (CBMT) - hosted by Sue Smith
 Living Newfoundland and Labrador (CBNT) - hosted by Erin Sulley
 Living Saskatchewan (CBKT) - hosted by Connie Walker
 Living Vancouver (CBUT) - hosted by Jaeny Baik
 Living Winnipeg (CBWT) - hosted by Mary McCown

References

External links
Breeze

2000s Canadian television talk shows
2007 Canadian television series debuts
2009 Canadian television series endings
CBC Television original programming
Television shows filmed in Calgary
Television shows filmed in Halifax, Nova Scotia
Television shows filmed in Montreal
Television shows filmed in Ottawa
Television shows filmed in Regina, Saskatchewan
Television shows filmed in St. John's, Newfoundland and Labrador
Television shows filmed in Toronto
Television shows filmed in Vancouver
Television shows filmed in Winnipeg